The 2013 South Australian National Football League (SANFL) Grand Final saw Norwood defeat North Adelaide by 40 points to claim the club's 29th premiership victory.

The match was played on Sunday 6 October 2013 at Football Park in front of a crowd of 36,685.

References 

SANFL Grand Finals
Sanfl Grand Final, 2013